Bahadoran (also Romanized as Bahādorān and Bahāderān; also known as Bahādor and Bahādurān) is a village in Nasrovan Rural District, in the Central District of Darab County, Fars Province, Iran. At the 2006 census, its population was 699, in 139 families.

References 

Populated places in Darab County